Kellen Louis Mond (born June 22, 1999) is an American football quarterback for the Cleveland Browns of the National Football League (NFL). He played college football at Texas A&M, where he was a four-year starter and became one of three SEC quarterbacks to record over 9,000 career passing yards with 1,500 rushing yards. Mond was drafted by the Minnesota Vikings in the third round of the 2021 NFL Draft.

High school career
Mond originally attended Ronald Reagan High School in San Antonio, Texas, before transferring to IMG Academy in Bradenton, Florida, prior to his senior year. As a senior, he passed for 1,936 yards and 20 touchdowns and rushed for 775 yards and 18 touchdowns. Mond was rated by the Rivals.com recruiting network as a five-star recruit and was ranked as the number one dual-threat quarterback in his class. He committed to Texas A&M University to play college football under head coach Kevin Sumlin.

College career
Mond entered his freshman year at Texas A&M in 2017 as a backup to Nick Starkel, but took over as the starter after Starkel was injured during the first game of the season against the UCLA Bruins. In his first career start, he completed 12-of-21 passes for 105 yards and a touchdown. Prior to Texas A&M's first game of the NCAA 2018-2019 season, Jimbo Fisher, who was in his first year as Texas A&M's head coach, replacing Kevin Sumlin, announced that Kellen Mond would be the starting quarterback for the season opener. Despite an initial feeling that Mond and Nick Starkel would continue to battle for the job after a long competition over the summer, Mond held on to the starting position for the remainder of the season, guiding the Aggies to an 8–4 record and a #19 ranking in the regular season College Football Playoff rankings. The Aggies' season culminated in a historic 74–72 seven-overtime win over SEC rival LSU. This game set several records, including the most points ever scored in a game in the FBS era, and tied a handful of other games for the longest college football game of all time with seven overtimes.

Entering the 2019 season, expectations were higher for Mond, though his overall performance failed to meet them. While his pass completion rate improved, his total yards and yards-per-attempt slightly decreased. In the 2020 season, however, he was able to improve with career-highs in pass completion percentage (63.5%) and yards-per-attempt (7.6). The Aggies finished the 2020 season 9–1 and ranked fourth in the final AP Poll. Mond performed at the 2021 Senior Bowl and was named its most valuable player.

He finished his career at Texas A&M as one of three SEC quarterbacks, along with Tim Tebow and Dak Prescott, to record over 9,000 career passing yards with 1,500 rushing yards.

Statistics

Professional career

Minnesota Vikings

Mond was selected by the Minnesota Vikings in the third round with the 66th overall pick in the 2021 NFL Draft. He signed his four-year rookie contract with Minnesota on June 15, 2021.

Ahead of the Vikings' Week 17 matchup against the Green Bay Packers, Kirk Cousins was ruled out after testing positive for COVID-19. Head coach Mike Zimmer named Mond the backup to Sean Mannion. Mond's debut came in the fourth quarter after Zimmer benched Mannion. He completed two of three passes for five yards in the 37–10 loss.

On August 30, 2022, Mond was waived by the Vikings.

Cleveland Browns

On August 31, 2022, Mond was claimed off waivers by the Cleveland Browns.

References

External links
Minnesota Vikings bio
Texas A&M Aggies bio

1999 births
Living people
Players of American football from San Antonio
American football quarterbacks
IMG Academy alumni
Texas A&M Aggies football players
Minnesota Vikings players
Cleveland Browns players